Shirin Nezammafi is an Iranian writer who resides in Japan. Though her native language is Persian, she writes in Japanese. She is fluent in English, Persian and Japanese.

Biography 
Nezammafi was born in Tehran in 1970, Iran and moved to Japan in 1999.  Shirin Nezammafi is a graduate of Kobe University, where she received her B.S. in Systems Engineering in 2004 and her M.S. in Information Technology in 2006. After graduation she joined Panasonic Corporation in Japan. She is currently working at the Dubai subsidiary.

Nezammafi won the Bungakukai Shinjinsho Award (the New Authors Prize) in 2009 for her second book, White Paper. She was the second non-Japanese author to accomplish so (and the first from a nation whose native tongue does not utilize Chinese characters). In 2009, Nezammafi was nominated for the Akutagawa Prize and is the third writer from a country that doesn't use kanji to ever to be nominated for it.

Publications 

"Shiroikami / Salam" (Bungeishunju, 2009-8-7)

Among her other works are:
 short story , winner of the 2006 Japanese Literary Award for International Students,
 Hakudo (Pulse) also nominated for the Akutagawa Prize in 2010, and
 Mimi no ue no choucho (The Butterfly on the Ear) in 2011.

Prizes 
2006, Won the Ryugakusei Bungakusho ("Salam")
2009-4, Won the 108th Bungakukai shinjinsho ("Shiroikami")
2009-7, Shortlisted for the 141st Akutagawa Prize  ("Shiroikami")
2010-7, Shortlisted for the 143rd Akutagawa Prize ("Hakudou")

Other activities 
 Appearing in the Ministry of Foreign Affairs official video, Omotenashi: Japan Fascinating Diversity, 2012
 Commemorative lecture at Kobe University entrance ceremony of the academic year 2012

References

External links/References
 Shirin Nezammafi, WorldCat 
 List of Nezammafi's publications

Iranian expatriates in Japan
Iranian writers
1979 births
Living people
Kobe University alumni
People from Tehran